Bidorpitia arbitralis is a species of moth of the family Tortricidae. It is found in Peru.

The wingspan is about 25 mm. The ground colour of the forewings is rust brown with refractive strigulation (fine streaks). The markings are browner. The hindwings are orange, but paler basally.

Etymology
The species name refers to an arbitrary identification of the species, as Bidorpitia ceramica is known from a male only.

References

Moths described in 2010
Euliini
Moths of South America
Taxa named by Józef Razowski